CKFU-FM, branded as 100.1 Moose FM, is a Canadian radio station, broadcasting in Fort St. John, British Columbia. The station is one of the few commercial low power FM (LPFM) stations operating in Canada.

The station originally played a classic hits format, from the launch of the station in 2003 until March 12, 2009, when the station flipped to country.

Russ Wagg, on behalf of a corporation to be incorporated (669375 B. C. Ltd.) received approval by the CRTC on February 12, 2003 and was launched on September 1 that same year.

References

External links
100.1 Moose FM
 

Fort St. John, British Columbia
Kfu
Radio stations established in 2003
2003 establishments in British Columbia